Qangdoi, or Qiangdui, is a township in Bainang County, in the Shigatse prefecture-level city of the Tibet Autonomous Region of China. At the time of the 2010 census, the township had a population of 2,369. , it had seven villages under its administration. The Nyang River flows to the south of the main village.

References 

Township-level divisions of Tibet
Populated places in Shigatse